Frederick MacLachlan (21 August 1899 – 1982) was a Scottish professional footballer who played as a wing half.

References

1899 births
1982 deaths
People from Kirkcudbright
Scottish footballers
Association football wing halves
St Cuthbert Wanderers F.C. players
Dalbeattie Star F.C. players
Partick Thistle F.C. players
Aberdeen F.C. players
Maidstone United F.C. (1897) players
Coventry City F.C. players
Grimsby Town F.C. players
Bury F.C. players
Halifax Town A.F.C. players
English Football League players
Scottish Football League players